The United States House Committee on Small Business is a standing committee of the United States House of Representatives. It was established in 1941 as the House Select Committee on Small Business.

History
On December 4, 1941, the U. S. House of Representatives created the first House Select Committee on Small Business in response to a growing number of small business activists and organizations advocating for more protections and better government policies for America's small businesses. While it had no legislative authority, the select committee became popular with House members and was reauthorized every following Congress until January 5, 1975, when it was made a permanent standing committee. House members then granted the new standing committee with certain areas of legislative jurisdiction and oversight functions, increasing its scope and influence.

Specifically, the House Small Business Committee is charged with assessing and investigating the problems of small businesses and examining the impact of general business practices and trends on small businesses. The committee has oversight and legislative authority over the Small Business Administration (SBA) and its programs, as well as provides assistance to and protection of small businesses, including financial aid and the participation of small business enterprises in federal procurement and government contracts.

Jurisdiction
The Small Business Committee has oversight and legislative jurisdiction over the Small Business Administration and its programs, as well as provides assistance to and protection of small business, including financial aid and the participation of small business enterprises in federal procurement and government contracts. The committee also oversees matters related to the Regulatory Flexibility Act and the Paperwork Reduction Act. The jurisdiction extends to other programs and initiatives addressing small business outside of the confines of these two specific acts.

Members, 118th Congress

Resolutions electing members:  (Chair),  (Ranking Member),  (R),  (D)

Subcommittees

Chairmen

Historical membership rosters

117th Congress

Resolutions electing members:  (Chair),  (Ranking Member),  (D),  (R),  (R),  (D),  (D),  (R)

Subcommittees

116th Congress

Sources:  (Chair),  (Ranking Member),  (D),  (R),  (D),  (R),  (D)

Subcommittees

115th Congress

Sources:  (Chair),  (Ranking Member),  (D),  (R),  (D)

See also
 U.S. Senate Committee on Small Business and Entrepreneurship
 List of current United States House of Representatives committees

References

External links
 Official site (Archive)
 House Small Business Committee. Legislation activity and reports, Congress.gov.
 House Small Business Committee Hearings and Meetings Video. Congress.gov.

Small Business
Economy of the United States
1941 establishments in Washington, D.C.
Organizations established in 1941